Gamanam is a 2021 Indian Telugu-language anthology film written and directed by debutant Sujana Rao and produced by Ramesh Karutoori, Venki Pushadapu and Gnana Shekar V.S under the Kria Film Corp and Kali Productions banners. The film stars Shriya Saran, Siva Kandukuri and Priyanka Jawalkar along with Suhas, Nithya Menen, Charuhasan, Bithiri Sathi, and Ravi Prakash. The dialogues were written by Sai Madhav Burra. The film was released on 10 December 2021.

Cast 

 Shriya Saran as Kamala
 Siva Kandukuri as Ali
 Priyanka Jawalkar as Zara
 Suhas as Abdullah, Ali's friend 
 Nithya Menen as Shailaputri Devi
 Charuhasan as Ali's Grandfather 
 Bithiri Sathi
 Ravi Prakash as Police Officer Raghuram
 Priya
 Indu Anand as Ali's Grandmother 
 Nehanth
 Sanjay Swaroop as Zara's Father 
 Kancharapalem Raju as cricket coach

Production 
The principal photography of the film started in 2019. Majority of the film was shot in Hyderabad and Visakhapatnam cities. The shooting of the film was completed in early 2020. While the post-production of the film was resumed in September 2020, there were many delays in production due to COVID-19 pandemic.

Release 
The Telugu version of the film was released on 10 December, while Hindi, Tamil, Malayalam and Kannada languages released on 1 March 2022 in Amazon Prime Video.

Soundtrack 
The music of the film is composed by Ilaiyaraaja and lyrics are written by Krishnakanth.

Reception 
Neeshitha Nyayapati of The Times of India, rated the film 3/5 and wrote, "Gamanam is a mixed bag that has some good moments while others leave you wanting." Sangeetha Devi Dundoo of The Hindu appreciating the director, wrote, "Despite the predictable pitfalls, the film holds its own and narrates stories with conviction, marking the arrival of a new director who is unafraid to go against mainstream Telugu film tropes."

References 

2020s Telugu-language films
Films scored by Ilaiyaraaja
Indian anthology films
2021 films
Films shot in Hyderabad, India
Films shot in Visakhapatnam
Films set in Hyderabad, India
Films set in Visakhapatnam
2021 directorial debut films